Alexander Lake is a lake in South Central Alaska, located at head of Alexander Creek (Susitna River),  North of Tyonek, Alaska on Cook Inlet Low.

Hydrology
Alexander Creek (Susitna River) in turn drains into Cook Inlet on the Pacific Ocean.

Natural history

According to the Alaska Department of Fish and Game, Alexander Lake is known by Alaskan Natives for its Tree Squirrel population, calling it "Deldida Bena", (Tree Squirrel Lake).

History
Alexander Lake reported in 1926 by Capps (1935, pl. 1), United States Geological Survey.

Name
Probably derived from Alexander Creek (Susitna River) which drains the lake.

Alexander Lake is also known as Deldida Bena ("Tree Squirrel Lake") by Alaska Natives.

See also
List of lakes of Alaska

References

Lakes of Alaska
Lakes of Matanuska-Susitna Borough, Alaska